Electra Airways is a Bulgarian charter and ACMI airline.

History
The airline was founded in 2016 and commenced flight operations one year later in August 2017 with a single Airbus A320 for various tour operators.

Destinations
The airline currently operates charter flights in Europe, North Africa and the Middle East.

Fleet

Current fleet
The Electra Airways fleet consists of the following aircraft (as of March 2023):

Former fleet
Electra Airways have also previously operated the following aircraft types:

References

External links

 Official website

Airlines of Bulgaria
Companies based in Sofia
Airlines established in 2016
Bulgarian companies established in 2016